Group A of the 1998 FIFA World Cup was one of eight groups of four teams competing at the 1998 World Cup in France. The first matches were played on 10 June 1998 and the final games took place simultaneously on 23 June 1998.

The group consisted of world champions Brazil, Norway, Scotland and Morocco. Matches took place at six different venues around France.

After Brazil beat Scotland and Morocco while Norway drew with Morocco and Scotland, Brazil had qualified as group winners with a game to spare. With ten minutes to go in the final two games, Morocco looked like they would take second place, because they were beating Scotland while Brazil were beating Norway. However, Norway scored two late goals to win and take the second qualifying place away from Morocco.

Standings

Brazil advanced to play Chile (runner-up of Group B) in the round of 16.
Norway advanced to play Italy (winner of Group B) in the round of 16.

Matches

Brazil vs Scotland

Morocco vs Norway

Scotland vs Norway

Brazil vs Morocco

Scotland vs Morocco

Brazil vs Norway

Group A
Group
Norway at the 1998 FIFA World Cup
Group
Group